Shuji Kawarada (瓦田 脩二, born 18 April 1994) is a Japanese kickboxer, currently competing in the lightweight division of K-1. A professional competitor since 2017, he is the former Krush Lightweight champion, having held the title from 2021 to 2022.

He was ranked as a top ten super bantamweight kickboxer by Combat Press between August 2021 and March 2022, as well as between May and June 2022.

Kickboxing career

Early career
Kawarada made his professional debut against Koji Suzuki at Krush 80 on September 8, 2017. He won the fight by a first-round stoppage, knocking out Suzuki with a right straight at the 2:25 minute mark.

Kawarada was scheduled to face Takahito Oki at Krush 82 on November 5, 2017. He won the fight by a second-round technical knockout, successfully knocking Oki down three times inside the distance.

Kawarada was scheduled to face Kazuki Yamashita at Krush 84 on January 27, 2018. He won the fight by unanimous decision, with scores of 30–28, 30–29 and 30–27.

Kawarada was scheduled to face Yuki Takeuchi at Krush 87 on April 22, 2018. He won the fight by a third-round technical knockout, managing to knock Takeuchi down three times in under two and a half minutes.

Kawarada was scheduled to face Kota Nakano at Krush 90 on July 22, 2018. He won the fight by unanimous decision, with scores of 29–27, 29–28 and 30–27. Kawarada scored the sole knockdown of the fight in the second round, dropping Nakano with a right straight.

First losses
Kawarada made his K-1 debut against Hisaki Higashimoto at K-1 World GP 2018: inaugural Cruiserweight Championship Tournament on September 24, 2018. He lost the fight by majority decision, with scores of 28–28, 29–28 and 30–27.

Kawarada was scheduled to face Hikaru Hasumi at Krush 97 on January 26, 2019. He won the fight by a third-round knockout. Kawarada finished Hasumi with a knee strike in the very last second of the bout.

Kawarada was scheduled to face Shinichiro Kawasaki at K-1 KRUSH FIGHT 99 on March 30, 2019. He was knocked down three times in the first round, which resulted in an automatic TKO loss.

Kawarada was scheduled to face Zhiwei Wang at K-1 KRUSH FIGHT 103 on July 21, 2019. Wang won the fight by unanimous decision.

Winning streak
After losing two consecutive fights for the first time in his career, Kawarada was scheduled to face Shu Inagaki at K-1 KRUSH FIGHT 109 on December 15, 2019. Kawarada rebounded from his losses with a first-round knockout victory.

Kawarada was scheduled to face Yuzuki Satomi at Krush 113 on June 28, 2020. The fight was eventually rescheduled for Krush 115 on July 21, 2020. Kawarada won the fight by unanimous decision, with all three judges scoring the fight 30–28 in his favor.

Kawarada made his return to K-1 K-1 World GP 2020 in Osaka on September 22, 2020, when he was scheduled to face Seiya Ueda. He won the fight by unanimous decision.

Kawarada was scheduled to face the 2018 K-1 Lightweight grand prix finalist Fumiya Osawa at K-1 World GP 2020 Winter's Crucial Bout on December 13, 2020. He won the fight by split decision, after an extra round was fought.

Kawarada was scheduled to face Hisaki Higashimoto at K'Festa 4 Day 1 on March 21, 2021. He won the fight by a first-round technical knockout.

Krush Lightweight champion

Krush Super Bantamweight tournament
Kawarada participated in the Krush lightweight tournament, held at Krush 127 on July 24, 2021. He was scheduled to face Shoya in the tournament quarterfinals. He won the fight by unanimous decision, with scores of 30–27, 30–26 and 30–25. Kawarada was scheduled to face Daiki Nagumo in the tournament semifinals, held at Krush 129 on September 24, 2021. He won the fight by a third-round knockout, forcing Nagumo to take a knee with numerous body punches and which left him unable to rise in time for the eight count. Kawarada advanced to the tournament finals, where he faced Satomi Yuzuki, who had earned his place there with a majority decision win against Hiroki. Kawarada won the fight by majority decision, with two of the three judges awarding him a 30-29 scorecard.

Title reign
Kawarada was scheduled to face the former Krush Super Lightweight champion Yuto Shinohara at K-1 World GP 2022 Japan on February 27, 2022. He lost the fight by unanimous decision, with all three judges scoring the bout 30–29 in Shinohara's favor.

Kawarada was booked to make his first Krush lightweight title defense against Fumiya Osawa at Krush 136 on April 30, 2022. He lost the fight by unanimous decision, with scores of 30–28, 30–28 and 30–27.

Post title reign
Kawarada faced Shoya at Krush 142 on October 28, 2022. The bout was a rematch of their Krush 127 fight, which Kawarada won by unanimous decision. Kawarada lost the fight by split decision, after an extra fourth round was fought.

Titles and accomplishments

Professional
Krush
 2021 Krush Lightweight (-62.5kg) Champion
 2021 Fight of the Year Award (vs Satomi Yuzuki)

Amateur
 2017 K-1 All Japan A-class -65kg Champion
 2016 WBMF International Thai Martial Arts Games 63.5kg 
 2015 All Japan College Kickboxing Lightweight Champion

Fight record

|-  style="background:#fbb;"
| 2022-10-28 || Loss ||align=left| Shoya || Krush 142 || Tokyo, Japan || Ext.R Decision (Split) || 4 || 3:00 
|-
|-  style="background:#fbb;"
| 2022-04-30 || Loss ||align=left| Fumiya Osawa|| Krush 136 || Tokyo, Japan || Decision (Unanimous) || 3 || 3:00  
|-
! style=background:white colspan=9 |
|- style="background:#fbb"
| 2022-02-27|| Loss ||align=left| Yuto Shinohara ||  K-1 World GP 2022 Japan || Tokyo, Japan || Decision (Unanimous)  || 3 ||3:00  
|-  style="background:#cfc;"
| 2021-09-24 || Win ||align=left| Yuzuki Satomi|| Krush 129, Lightweight Championship Tournament Final || Tokyo, Japan || Decision (Majority) || 3 || 3:00 
|-
! style=background:white colspan=9 |

|-  style="background:#cfc;"
| 2021-09-24 || Win ||align=left| Daiki Nagumo|| Krush 129, Lightweight Championship Tournament Semi Final || Tokyo, Japan || KO (Punches) || 3 || 1:33 

|-  style="background:#cfc;"
| 2021-07-24 || Win||align=left| Shoya || Krush 127, Lightweight Championship Tournament Quarter Final || Tokyo, Japan || Decision (Unanimous) || 3 || 3:00
|-
|-  style="background:#cfc;"
| 2021-03-21 || Win||align=left| Hisaki Higashimoto || K'Festa 4 Day 1 || Tokyo, Japan || TKO (Doctor stoppage) || 1 || 1:20
|-
|-  style="background:#cfc;"
| 2020-12-13 || Win||align=left| Fumiya Osawa || K-1 World GP 2020 Winter's Crucial Bout || Tokyo, Japan || Ext. R. Decision (Split) || 3 || 3:00
|-
|-  style="background:#cfc;"
| 2020-09-22 || Win||align=left| Seiya Ueda || K-1 World GP 2020 in Osaka || Osaka, Japan || Decision (Unanimous) || 3 || 3:00
|-
|-  style="background:#cfc;"
| 2020-07-21 || Win||align=left| Yuzuki Satomi || Krush 115 || Tokyo, Japan || Decision (Unanimous) || 3 || 3:00
|-
|-  style="background:#cfc;"
| 2019-12-15 || Win||align=left| Shu Inagaki || Krush 109 || Tokyo, Japan || KO (Right Hook) || 1 || 2:40
|-
|-  style="background:#fbb;"
| 2019-07-21 || Loss ||align=left| Wang Zhiwei || Krush 103 || Tokyo, Japan || Decision (Unanimous) || 3 || 3:00
|-
|-  style="background:#fbb;"
| 2019-03-30 || Loss ||align=left| Shinichiro Kawasaki || Krush 99 || Tokyo, Japan || TKO (Three knockdowns) || 1 || 2:45
|-
|-  style="background:#cfc;"
| 2019-01-26 || Win ||align=left| Hikaru Hasumi || Krush 97 || Tokyo, Japan || KO (Knee) || 3 || 2:59
|-
|-  style="background:#fbb;"
| 2018-09-24 || Loss ||align=left| Hisaki Higashimoto || K-1 World GP 2018: inaugural Cruiserweight Championship Tournament || Saitama, Japan || Decision (Majority) || 3 || 3:00
|-
|-  style="background:#cfc;"
| 2018-07-22 || Win ||align=left| Kota Nakano || Krush 90 || Tokyo, Japan || Decision (Unanimous) || 3 || 3:00
|-
|-  style="background:#cfc;"
| 2018-04-22 || Win ||align=left| Yuki Takeuchi || Krush 87 || Tokyo, Japan || TKO (Three knockdowns) || 1 || 2:21
|-
|-  style="background:#cfc;"
| 2018-01-27 || Win ||align=left| Kazuki Yamashita || Krush 84 || Tokyo, Japan || Decision (Unanimous) || 3 || 3:00
|-
|-  style="background:#cfc;"
| 2017-11-05 || Win ||align=left| Takahito Oki || Krush 82 || Tokyo, Japan || TKO (Three knockdowns) || 2 || 2:25
|-
|-  style="background:#cfc;"
| 2017-09-08 || Win ||align=left| Koji Suzuki || Krush 80 || Tokyo, Japan || KO (Right straight) || 1 || 2:25
|-
| colspan=9 | Legend:    

|-  style="background:#cfc;"
| 2017-06-25 || Win ||align=left| Hikaru Katase || 4th K-1 Amateur All Japan Tournament, Final || Tokyo, Japan || Decision (Unanimous) || 1 ||2:00
|-
! style=background:white colspan=9 |

|-  style="background:#cfc;"
| 2017-06-25 || Win ||align=left| Kazuki Matsumoto || 4th K-1 Amateur All Japan Tournament, Semi Final || Tokyo, Japan || KO  || 1 ||

|-  style="background:#cfc;"
| 2017-03-26 || Win ||align=left| Koji Suzuki || K-1 Amateur All Japan Selection Tournament, Final || Tokyo, Japan || KO || 1 || 

|-  style="background:#cfc;"
| 2017-03-26 || Win ||align=left| Akitoshi Nakajima || K-1 Amateur All Japan Selection Tournament, Semi Final || Tokyo, Japan || Decision (Unanimous) || 1 || 2:00

|-  style="background:#cfc;"
| 2017-03-26 || Win ||align=left| Kazuki Matsumoto || K-1 Amateur All Japan Selection Tournament, Quarter Final || Tokyo, Japan || KO  || 1 ||

|-  style="background:#cfc;"
| 2016-12-11 || Win ||align=left| Naoyuki Arakawa || K-1 Amateur || Tokyo, Japan || KO  || 1 ||

|-  style="background:#fbb;"
| 2016-07-31 || Loss ||align=left| Kosuke Morii || 2016 K-1 College Tournament, Semi Final || Tokyo, Japan || Ext.R Decision (Unanimous)  || 2 ||2:00

|-  style="background:#cfc;"
| 2016-07-31 || Win ||align=left| Yushi Shishido || 2016 K-1 College Tournament, Quarter Final || Tokyo, Japan || Decision (Majority)  || 1 ||2:00

|-  style="background:#cfc;"
| 2016-06-19 || Win ||align=left| Kyosuke Takahashi || 84th All Japan College Kickboxing Championship|| Tokyo, Japan || Decision (Unanimous) || 3 ||2:00

|-  style="background:#cfc;"
| 2016-03- || Win ||align=left| Ancha Sorpa || 1st WMBF International Thai Martial Arts Games & Festival, Final|| Bangkok, Thailand || Decision ||  ||
|-
! style=background:white colspan=9 |

|-  style="background:#cfc;"
| 2016-03- || Win ||align=left|  || 1st WMBF International Thai Martial Arts Games & Festival, Semi Final|| Bangkok, Thailand || Decision ||  ||

|-  style="background:#cfc;"
| 2016-03- || Win ||align=left|  || 1st WMBF International Thai Martial Arts Games & Festival, Quarter Final|| Bangkok, Thailand || Decision ||  ||

|-  style="background:#cfc;"
| 2015-11-28 || Win ||align=left| Kazu Kitsukawa || 83rd All Japan College Kickboxing Championship Final|| Tokyo, Japan || KO (Punches) || 1 ||2:07
|-
! style=background:white colspan=9 |

|-  style="background:#cfc;"
| 2015-09-06 || Win ||align=left| Kenji Onami|| All Japan College Kickboxing UKF Selection || Tokyo, Japan || Decision (Unanimous) || 3 ||2:00

|-  style="background:#cfc;"
| 2015-06-21 || Win ||align=left| Kento Furuya || 82nd All Japan College Kickboxing Championship|| Tokyo, Japan || KO  || 1 ||2:09

|-  style="background:#cfc;"
| 2014-12-23 || Win ||align=left| Takatoshi Higuchi || REBELS Amateur BLOW CUP 34|| Tokyo, Japan || Decision (Majority) ||  ||

|-  style="background:#fbb;"
| 2014-11-29 || Loss ||align=left| Mizuho Besshi || 80th All Japan College Kickboxing Championship|| Tokyo, Japan || KO  || 1 ||

|-  style="background:#fbb;"
| 2014-09-07 || Loss ||align=left| Shunsuke Inoue ||All Japan College Kickboxing UKF Selection|| Tokyo, Japan || Decision (Majority) ||  ||

|-  style="background:#cfc;"
| 2014-02-16 || Win ||align=left| Shotaro Yamaguchi ||17th College Kickboxing UKF || Tokyo, Japan || KO || 3 ||1:33

|-
| colspan=9 | Legend:

See also
 List of male kickboxers

References

1994 births
Living people
Japanese male kickboxers
Sportspeople from Kitakyushu
21st-century Japanese people